WTMM may refer to:

 WTMM-FM, a radio station (104.5 FM) licensed to Mechanicville, New York, United States
 WGDJ, a radio station (1300 AM) licensed to Rensselaer, New York, United States, which used the call sign WTMM from August 1997 to January 2007 and from August 2007 to February 2008
 Wavelet transform modulus maxima method, a method for detecting fractal dimension of a signal or time-series